'Lachapelle Bridge', in French Pont Lachapelle,  (1930 and 1975) Also known as Cartierville Bridge. 

This bridge spans the Rivière des Prairies between the Montreal borough of Ahuntsic-Cartierville and the Laval (Île Jésus) neighbourhood of Chomedey.

Actually there are two bridges, side by side and parallel:

The older (1930) three lane span, on the down stream side, carries the traffic north into Laval. 

The newer (1975) three lane span, on the up stream side, carries the traffic south into Montreal.

Except for the length and the distance between the piers, the two spans are not identical.

A wooden bridge was originally built there in 1836, replaced by a steel one, built in 1882.

See also
 List of bridges in Canada
 List of bridges spanning the Rivière des Prairies
 List of crossings of the Rivière des Prairies

References

External links
 Un pont au-dessus de la rivière des Prairies (French)

Bridges in Montreal
Rivière des Prairies
Bridges in Laval, Quebec
Ahuntsic-Cartierville
Road bridges in Quebec